Joseph Franklin Beard (born May 1, 1939) is an American former professional golfer who was a member of the PGA Tour and Champions Tour. Beard won eleven PGA Tour events.

Early years
Beard was born in Dallas, Texas.  He attended Saint Xavier High School in Louisville, Kentucky, and won the Kentucky state high school golf championship as a senior in 1957.

College career
He attended the University of Florida in Gainesville, Florida, where he played for coach Conrad Rehling's Florida Gators men's golf team in National Collegiate Athletic Association (NCAA) competition from 1958 to 1961. He was recognized as an All-American in 1960 and 1961. He graduated from the university with a bachelor's degree in accounting in 1961, and was later inducted into the University of Florida Athletic Hall of Fame as a "Gator Great."

Professional career
Beard turned professional in 1962. He topped the PGA Tour money list in 1969 with earnings of $175,223. He has eleven wins on the tour including victories in the Tournament of Champions in 1967 and 1970. He was a member of the U.S. team in the Ryder Cup in 1969 and 1971 and had a 2–3–3 win–loss–half record. His best finishes in a major tournament were a third-place finish and a tie for third in the 1965 and 1975 U.S. Opens. After turning 50 years old, he played on the Senior PGA Tour (now the Champions Tour), where he won the 1990 Murata Reunion Pro-Am.

Beard has also worked as a golf commentator on ESPN. He was inducted as a member of the Kentucky Athletic Hall of Fame in 1986.

Professional wins (14)

PGA Tour wins (11)

PGA Tour playoff record (0–3)

Other wins (2)
1964 Kentucky Open
1967 Waterloo Open Golf Classic

Senior PGA Tour wins (1)

Senior PGA Tour playoff record (0–1)

Results in major championships

CUT = missed the half-way cut
"T" indicates a tie for a place

Summary

Most consecutive cuts made – 20 (1964 PGA – 1971 Masters)
Longest streak of top-10s – 2 (three times)

U.S. national team appearances
Professional
Ryder Cup: 1969 (winners), 1971 (winners)

See also

List of American Ryder Cup golfers
List of Florida Gators men's golfers on the PGA Tour
List of University of Florida alumni
List of University of Florida Athletic Hall of Fame members

References

External links

American male golfers
Florida Gators men's golfers
PGA Tour golfers
PGA Tour Champions golfers
Ryder Cup competitors for the United States
Golfers from Dallas
Golfers from Kentucky
St. Xavier High School (Louisville) alumni
Sportspeople from Louisville, Kentucky
1939 births
Living people